{{DISPLAYTITLE:Technetium (99mTc) pintumomab}}

Technetium (99mTc) pintumomab (INN) is a mouse monoclonal antibody for the imaging of adenocarcinoma. It is labelled with the radioisotope technetium-99m.

References

Monoclonal antibodies for tumors
Technetium compounds
Technetium-99m